Private Wars is the third single by Japanese band Dream, released on May 5, 2000. It reached number 13 on the weekly Oricon charts and charted for seven weeks. It was used as the ending song to the TV Tokyo show Sukiyaki!! London Boots Daisakusen.

Track list
 Private Wars (original mix) mixed by Dave Ford
 Private Wars (Dub's Hyper club remix) remixed by Izumi "D・M・X" Miyazaki
 Private Wars (Euro mix) remixed by Y&Co.
 Private Wars (instrumental)
 Private Wars (Sea Breeze 2000 mix) mixed by Dave Ford

Credits
 Lyrics: Yuko Ebine
 Music: Dai Nagao
 Arrangement: Keisuke Kikuchi
 Chorus arrangement: Yasu Kitajima

External links
 http://www.oricon.co.jp/music/release/d/45151/1/

2000 singles
Dream (Japanese group) songs